Christos Karkamanis (born 22 September 1969) is a former Greek football player. He played for Aris and Iraklis, as well as for the national side. He competed at the 1994 FIFA World Cup, where he was the starting goalkeeper in a 0–2 loss against Nigeria.

In July 2007, Karkamanis was signed as the goalkeeping coach for Ethnikos Katerini.

References

External links
 

1969 births
Living people
Greek footballers
Greece international footballers
Aris Thessaloniki F.C. players
Iraklis Thessaloniki F.C. players
Kozani F.C. players
Olympiacos Volos F.C. players
Trikala F.C. players
Edessaikos F.C. players
Super League Greece players
1994 FIFA World Cup players
Association football goalkeepers
Footballers from Thessaloniki